Gangut (Russian: броненосец "Гангут") was an Imperial Russian coast defense ship named after the Battle of Gangut. This ship was a scaled-down version of the s

Design and construction

The aim was to have a cheaper vessel able to operate in the shallow water of the Baltic Sea with long range deployment to the Mediterranean and the Far East. The specification was issued in 1887 and the design was approved by the Marine Technical Committee in 1888.

She was built by New Admiralty yard, Saint Petersburg. Construction started on 29 October 1888, and she was launched on 3 July 1893. Completed in 1894, she was 600 tons over her designed displacement which led to an increase in draught and a loss in speed. Her trials were difficult and she had to return to Kronstadt to have repairs after 19 days. Several modernisation schemes to correct the defects were considered but did not proceed due to extensive demands on the Russian shipbuilding industry.

Armament

The main armament comprised a single  gun in a barbette mounting at the bow. The secondary armament comprised four  guns in casemates and four  guns which were not protected. Anti torpedo-boat armament comprised six  guns and twelve  Hotchkiss guns. There were also four  landing guns and six torpedo tubes. The Russian Navy considered replacing the 305 mm gun with another 229 mm gun to reduce weight. Another plan was to replace the secondary armament with new 152 mm Canet guns and leave the 305 mm gun in place.

Protection

Compound armour was used. The Russian Navy Marine Technical Kommittee (MTK) considered re-armouring her with a thinner belt of stronger Harvey armour

Machinery

Two vertical triple expansion steam engines with eight cylindrical boilers were installed. The ship also had a complex drainage system with steam turbine pumps. She proved slower than designed with a maximum speed of  rather than the intended .

Sinking

On 12 June 1897, Gangut hit an uncharted pinnacle of rock near Vyborg in the Gulf of Finland during a military exercise. A gash along the ship′s bottom led to both boiler rooms flooding and a loss of power to her pumps. Her bulkheads were poorly riveted, leading to leaks. Drawbacks in her design gave her limited stability and resulted in ineffective counter-flooding efforts by her crew. There were no fatalities.

The vessel was not popular in the Imperial Russian Navy. Rear Admiral Birilev, her former captain, is quoted as describing her as ".. a vile ship, it's good that she sank, and it is pointless to raise her."

A plan to refloat the ship by the Swedish Neptune Company was not carried out, although divers recovered some items from the ship in 1898.

See also
 
 List of Russian battleships

Notes

References
 This Article incorporates material translated from Russian Wikipedia

External links
 Gangut (Encyclopedia of Ships 
 Photos from the wreck 
 Article on Gangut
 М.А. Богданов, А.А. Гармашев. Эскадренные броненосцы «Гангут» и «Наварин». Журнал «Стапель» №4 за 2007 год. — СПб., ЛеКо, 2007 
 Article from Navy collection .ru 

Shipwrecks in the Gulf of Finland
Maritime incidents in 1897
1893 ships
Ships built at Admiralty Shipyard
Battleships of the Imperial Russian Navy